Johan Wallinder (born 19 August 1975) is a Swedish former professional footballer who played as forward. Wallinder was part of the Djurgården Swedish champions' team of 2002.

Honours
Djurgårdens IF
 Allsvenskan: 2002

References

Living people
1975 births
Association football forwards
Swedish footballers
Allsvenskan players
Örebro SK players
Helsingborgs IF players
Djurgårdens IF Fotboll players
Panetolikos F.C. players